Ali Rabo (born 6 June 1986) is a Burkinabé international footballer who plays for Vietnamese club Becamex Binh Duong as a defensive midfielder.

Career
Born in Bobo-Dioulasso, Rabo has played club football for ASFA Yennenga, Ittihad El-Shorta, Baghdad FC, El Mokawloon, Amanat Baghdad, Masafi and Becamex Bình Dương.

He made his international debut for Burkina Faso in 2012.

References

1986 births
Living people
Burkinabé footballers
Burkina Faso international footballers
ASFA Yennenga players
Ittihad El Shorta SC players
Amanat Baghdad players
Al Mokawloon Al Arab SC players
Masafi Club players
Becamex Binh Duong FC players
Egyptian Premier League players
Association football midfielders
Burkinabé expatriate footballers
Burkinabé expatriate sportspeople in Egypt
Expatriate footballers in Egypt
Burkinabé expatriate sportspeople in Iraq
Expatriate footballers in Iraq
Burkinabé expatriate sportspeople in the United Arab Emirates
Expatriate footballers in the United Arab Emirates
Burkinabé expatriate sportspeople in Vietnam
Expatriate footballers in Vietnam
2013 Africa Cup of Nations players
V.League 1 players
21st-century Burkinabé people